Charles South may refer to:

 Charles L. South (1892–1965), U.S. Representative from Texas
 Charles Frederick South (1850–1916), cathedral organist